Karranga (Karrangpurru) is an aboriginal language of Australia.

McConvell suspects Karrangpurru was a dialect of Mudburra because people said it was similar. However, it is undocumented and thus formally unclassifiable.

References 

Unclassified languages of Australia